During their medal ceremony in the Olympic Stadium in Mexico City on October 16, 1968, two African-American athletes, Tommie Smith and John Carlos, each raised a black-gloved fist during the playing of the US national anthem, "The Star-Spangled Banner". While on the podium, Smith and Carlos, who had won gold and bronze medals respectively in the 200-meter running event of the 1968 Summer Olympics, turned to face the US flag and then kept their hands raised until the anthem had finished. In addition, Smith, Carlos, and Australian silver medalist Peter Norman all wore human-rights badges on their jackets.

In his autobiography, Silent Gesture, published nearly 30 years later, Smith revised his statement that the gesture was not a "Black Power" salute per se, but rather a "human rights" salute. The demonstration is regarded as one of the most overtly political statements in the history of the modern Olympics.

The protest 

On the morning of October 16, 1968, US athlete Tommie Smith won the 200-meter race with a world-record time of 19.83 seconds. Australia's Peter Norman finished second with a time of 20.06 seconds (an Oceania record that still stands), and the US's John Carlos finished in third place with a time of 20.10 seconds. After the race was completed, the three went to the podium for their medals to be presented by David Cecil, 6th Marquess of Exeter. The two US athletes received their medals shoeless, but wearing black socks, to represent black poverty. Smith wore a black scarf around his neck to represent black pride, Carlos had his tracksuit top unzipped to show solidarity with all blue-collar workers in the US and wore a necklace of beads which he described "were for those individuals that were lynched, or killed and that no-one said a prayer for, that were hung and tarred. It was for those thrown off the side of the boats in the Middle Passage." All three athletes wore Olympic Project for Human Rights (OPHR) badges after Norman, a critic of Australia's former White Australia Policy, expressed empathy with their ideals. Sociologist Harry Edwards, the founder of the OPHR, had urged black athletes to boycott the games; reportedly, the actions of Smith and Carlos on October 16, 1968, were inspired by Edwards' arguments.

The famous picture of the event was taken by photographer John Dominis.

Both US athletes intended to bring black gloves to the event, but Carlos forgot his, leaving them in the Olympic Village. It was Peter Norman who suggested Carlos wear Smith's left-handed glove. For this reason, Carlos raised his left hand as opposed to his right, differing from the traditional Black Power salute. When The Star-Spangled Banner played, Smith and Carlos delivered the salute with heads bowed, a gesture which became front-page news around the world. As they left the podium they were booed by the crowd. Smith later said, "If I win, I am American, not a black American. But if I did something bad, then they would say I am a Negro. We are black and we are proud of being black. Black America will understand what we did tonight."

Tommie Smith stated in later years that "We were concerned about the lack of black assistant coaches. About how Muhammad Ali got stripped of his title. About the lack of access to good housing and our kids not being able to attend the top colleges."

International Olympic Committee response 
International Olympic Committee (IOC) president Avery Brundage, himself an American, deemed it to be a domestic political statement unfit for the apolitical, international forum the Olympic Games were intended to be. In response to their actions, he ordered Smith and Carlos suspended from the US team and banned from the Olympic Village. When the US Olympic Committee refused, Brundage threatened to ban the entire US track team. This threat led to the expulsion of the two athletes from the Games. However, contrary to a common misconception, the IOC did not force Smith and Carlos to return their medals.

A spokesman for the IOC said Smith and Carlos's actions were "a deliberate and violent breach of the fundamental principles of the Olympic spirit." Brundage, who was president of the United States Olympic Committee in 1936, had made no objections against Nazi salutes during the Berlin Olympics. He argued that the Nazi salute, being a national salute at the time, was acceptable in a competition of nations, while the athletes' salute was not of a nation and therefore unacceptable.

Brundage had been accused of being one of the United States' most prominent Nazi sympathisers even after the outbreak of the Second World War, and his removal as president of the IOC had been one of the three stated objectives of the Olympic Project for Human Rights.

In 2013, the official IOC website stated that "Over and above winning medals, the black American athletes made names for themselves by an act of racial protest."

Aftermath 
Smith and Carlos were largely ostracized by the US sporting establishment and they were subject to criticism. Time magazine on October 25, 1968, wrote: "'Faster, Higher, Stronger' is the motto of the Olympic Games. 'Angrier, nastier, uglier' better describes the scene in Mexico City last week." Back home, both Smith and Carlos were subject to abuse, and they and their families received death threats. Brent Musburger, a writer for the Chicago American before rising to prominence at CBS Sports and ESPN, described Smith and Carlos as "a couple of black-skinned storm troopers" who were "ignoble," "juvenile," and "unimaginative."

Smith continued in athletics, playing in the NFL with the Cincinnati Bengals before becoming an assistant professor of physical education at Oberlin College. In 1995, he helped coach the US team at the World Indoor Championships at Barcelona. In 1999, he was awarded the California Black Sportsman of the Millennium Award. He is now a public speaker.

Carlos's career followed a similar path. He tied the 100-yard dash world record the following year. Carlos also tried professional football, and was a 15th-round selection in the 1970 NFL Draft, but a knee injury curtailed his tryout with the Philadelphia Eagles. He then went on to the Canadian Football League, where he played one season for the Montreal Alouettes. He fell upon hard times in the late 1970s. In 1977, his ex-wife died by suicide, leading him to a period of depression. In 1982, Carlos worked with the Organizing Committee for the 1984 Summer Olympics in Los Angeles. In 1985, he became a track and field coach at Palm Springs High School. As of 2012, Carlos works as a counselor at the school.

Smith and Carlos received an Arthur Ashe Courage Award at the 2008 ESPY Awards honoring their action.

Silver medalist Norman, who was sympathetic to his competitors' protest, was reprimanded by his country's Olympic authorities, and he was criticized and ostracized by conservatives in the Australian media. He was not sent to the 1972 games, despite several times making the qualifying time, though opinions differ over whether that was due to the 1968 protest. When Sydney hosted the 2000 Summer Olympics, he was not invited to take part in the celebrations in Sydney, although he played a part in announcing Australian Olympic Teams in his role as a sports administrator in Melbourne. The United States invited him to Sydney to take part in Olympic celebrations when they heard that his own country had failed to do so. 

When Norman died in 2006, Smith and Carlos were pallbearers at his funeral.

In 2012, the Australian House of Representatives formally passed an apology to Norman, with MP Andrew Leigh telling Parliament that Norman's gesture "was a moment of heroism and humility that advanced international awareness of racial inequality." In 2018, the Australian Olympic Committee awarded Norman posthumously the AOC Order of Merit for his involvement of the protest, with AOC President John Coates stating "we've been negligent in not recognising the role he played back then."

Wayne Collett and Vincent Matthews were banned from the Olympics after they staged a similar protest at the 1972 games in Munich.

Documentary films 
The 2008 Sydney Film Festival featured a documentary about the protest entitled Salute. The film was written, directed, and produced by Matt Norman, a nephew of Peter Norman.

On July 9, 2008, BBC Four broadcast a documentary, Black Power Salute, by Geoff Small, about the protest. In an article, Small noted that the athletes of the British team attending the 2008 Olympics in Beijing had been asked to sign gagging clauses which would have restricted their right to make political statements but that they had refused.

Tributes 
In a 2011 speech to the University of Guelph, Akaash Maharaj, a member of the Canadian Olympic Committee and head of Canada's Olympic equestrian team, said, "In that moment, Tommie Smith, Peter Norman, and John Carlos became the living embodiments of Olympic idealism. Ever since, they have been inspirations to generations of athletes like myself, who can only aspire to their example of putting principle before personal interest. It was their misfortune to be far greater human beings than the leaders of the IOC of the day."

Since 2016, the National Museum of African American History and Culture in Washington, DC, also features a statue to honor the athletes' tribute.

San Jose 

In 2005, San Jose State University honored former students Smith and Carlos with a   statue of their protest titled Victory Salute, created by artist Rigo 23. A student, Erik Grotz, initiated the project; "One of my professors was talking about unsung heroes and he mentioned Tommie Smith and John Carlos. He said these men had done a courageous thing to advance civil rights, and, yet, they had never been honored by their own school."

Those who come to view the statue are allowed to participate by standing on the monument. Peter Norman is not included in the monument so viewers can be in his place; there is a plaque in the empty spot inviting those to "Take a Stand." Norman requested that his space was left empty so visitors could stand in his place and feel what he felt.
The bronze figures are shoeless but there are two shoes included at the base of the monument. The right shoe, a bronze, blue Puma, is next to Carlos; while the left shoe is placed behind Smith. The signature of the artist is on the back of Smith's shoe, and the year 2005 is on Carlos's shoe.

The faces of the statues are realistic and emotional. "The statue is made of fiberglass stretched over steel supports with an exoskeleton of ceramic tiles." Rigo 23 used 3D scanning technology and computer-assisted virtual imaging to take full-body scans of the men. Their track pants and jackets are a mosaic of dark blue ceramic tiles while the stripes of the track suits are detailed in red and white.

In January 2007, History San Jose opened a new exhibit called Speed City: From Civil Rights to Black Power, covering the San Jose State athletic program "from which many student athletes became globally recognized figures as the Civil Rights and Black Power movements reshaped American society."

Melbourne 
On October 9, 2019 – known locally as Peter Norman Day – a bronze statue of Norman was unveiled in Melbourne, Norman's hometown. This statue, created by Louis Laumen stands at the side of Lakeside Stadium.

Sydney mural 
In Australia, an airbrush mural of the trio on the podium was painted in 2000 in the inner-city suburb of Newtown in Sydney. Silvio Offria, who allowed the mural to be painted on his house in Leamington Lane by an artist known only as "Donald", said that Norman, a short time before he died in 2006, came to see the mural. "He came and had his photo taken; he was very happy," he said. The monochrome tribute, captioned "THREE PROUD PEOPLE MEXICO 68", was under threat of demolition in 2010 to make way for a rail tunnel but is now listed as an item of heritage significance.

West Oakland mural 
In the historically African-American neighborhood of West Oakland, California, there was a large mural depicting Smith and Carlos on the corner of 12th Street and Mandela Parkway.

Above the life-sized depictions read "Born with insight, raised with a fist" (Rage Against the Machine lyrics); previously it read "It only takes a pair of gloves". In early February 2015, the mural was razed.

The private lot was once a gas station, and the mural was on the outside wall of an abandoned building or shed. The owner wanted to pay respect to the men and the moment but also wanted a mural to prevent tagging. The state was monitoring water contamination levels at this site; the testing became within normal levels "so the state ordered the removal of the tanks, testing equipment, and demolition of the shed."

Music 

The song "Mr. John Carlos" by the Swedish group Nationalteatern on their 1974 album Livet är en fest is about the event and its aftermath.
 The music video for Scritti Politti's 1984 single, "Wood Beez (Pray Like Aretha Franklin)", features several direct visual references to the 1968 protest.
 Rage Against the Machine used a cropped photo of the salute on the cover art for the "Testify" single (2000). The image has both men wearing shoes.
 The cover art for the single "HiiiPoWeR" (2011) by American rapper Kendrick Lamar features a cropped photo of the salute.
 The song "Hoarse" (2013) by American rapper Earl Sweatshirt features the lines "pinnacle of titillating crispate, fists clenched, emulating '68 Olympics".
 The music video for "The Story of O.J." (2017) by American rapper Jay-Z features a depiction of the protest.
 The song "Shivers" by Peter Perrett, best known as the frontman of The Only Ones, features the lines "The torch of liberty, Tommie Smith's black glove".
 The music video for "The Space Program" (2017) by American Hip-Hop group A Tribe Called Quest features Pharrell Williams imitating the salute.
 The music video for "I Can't Breathe" (2018) by singer/songwriter Patrick Gannon features the salute and an interview with Tommie Smith at the end.

Works 
 The John Carlos Story: The Sports Moment That Changed the World, by John Carlos and Dave Zirin, Haymarket Books (2011) 
 Three Proud People (2000) [Mural]. 39 Pine Street Newtown NSW Australia.

See also

 1972 Olympics Black Power salute
 List of photographs considered the most important
 List of Olympic Games scandals and controversies
 Doug Roby
 Kozakiewicz's gesture
 Jesse Owens
 Colin Kaepernick
 Raven Saunders
 U.S. national anthem protests

References

External links 
 "The Politics of Hypocrisy" – includes authorized excerpt from  The Harvard Crimson of November 6, 1968.
 "Matt Norman, Director/Producer 'Salute'" (podcast: nephew of Peter Norman discusses new documentary about Norman's role in the Black Power salute)
 "El Black Power de Mexico: 40 años después" (Diario La Nación of Buenos Aires, November 10, 2008)
 "This was my decision" (Tommie Smith talks about his silent protest, August 8, 2008)

Olympics Human Rights Salute, 1968
Olympics Human Rights Salute, 1968
Black Power
Civil rights protests
Hand gestures
Politics and race in the United States
Protests in Mexico
Olympic Games controversies
Anti-racism
Politics and sports
Salutes
1968 in art
1968 photographs
Color photographs
Photographs of protests
Race-related controversies in photography
Television controversies
Political controversies in the United States